Goniothalamus scortechinii is a species of plant in the family Annonaceae. It is native to Peninsular Malaysia and Thailand. George King, the British botanist who first formally described the species, named it in honor of Benedetto Scortechini, an Italian priest and member of the Linnean Society of London and New South Wales who collected many important botanical samples in Peninsular Malaysia.

Description
It is a tree reaching 7 meters in height.  Its membranous, oblong to lance-shaped leaves are 22-50 by 5.5-19.5 centimeters with short tapering tips and pointed bases. Its leaves have 18-32 pairs of secondary veins emanating from their midribs that arch near the leaf margins. Its petioles are 0.8 centimeters long. Its 3 membranous, rigid, round to oval sepals are 0.8-2.4 by 0.8-2.3 centimeters with shallowly  pointed tips and fused at bases. Its solitary (rarely in pairs) flowers are in axillary positions and on pedicels that are 1.27 centimeters long. The pedicels are thicker at their apex, curved downward and have two bracts at their base. Its flowers have 6 petals arranged in two rows of three. The leathery, oblong to lance-shaped outer petals are 1.7-2.5 by 0.8-1.4 centimeters with shallow tips. The outer petals are covered in fine rust colored hairs. The leathering, oval inner petals are 1.3 centimeters long with pointed tips. The inner petals are covered in fine rust colored hairs. Its flowers have 126-180 stamen. Its flowers have 15-32 carpels. Each carpel has 1 ovule, a straight style, and a 2-3 lobed stigma. Its fruit are on pedicels that are 0.8-2.0 centimeters long. The hairless, oval to oblong fruit are 1.1 centimeters long and have persistent calyx. The fruit have pale, smooth, hairless to sparsely hairy seeds.

Reproductive biology
The pollen of G. scortechinii is shed as permanent tetrads.

Habitat and distribution
It has been observed growing in rainforests at elevations of 30-500 meters.

Uses
It is commonly called Akar Gajah Beranak and is used in traditional medicine.  Bioactive molecules extracted from its leaves have been reported to have antiplasmodial, and antibacterial activity.

References

scortechinii
Flora of Peninsular Malaysia
Flora of Thailand
Traditional medicine
Plants described in 1892
Taxa named by George King (botanist)